In the Middle of Nowhere is the fourth studio album by German duo Modern Talking, released on 10 November 1986 by Hansa Records. The album spawned the single "Geronimo's Cadillac", which charted within the top five in Germany and Austria, while entering the top 10 in many others including Switzerland, Sweden and Norway.

The album debuted at number one in Germany on 1 December 1986, spending a total of seven weeks within the top 10 on the chart. It was eventually certified gold by the Bundesverband Musikindustrie (BVMI), denoting shipments in excess of 250,000 units in Germany.

Track listing

Personnel
 Dieter Bohlen – production, arrangements
 Luis Rodríguez – co-production
 Manfred Vormstein – art direction, design, cover photo
 Matthias Kortemeier – design
 Didi Zill – artists photo

Charts

Weekly charts

Year-end charts

Certifications

References

External links
 

1986 albums
Hansa Records albums
Modern Talking albums